Evgeny Maslin (1937-2022) was a Soviet Russian general. He was the head of the 12th Chief Directorate of the Russian Ministry of Defense. He was responsible for the security of nuclear weapons. After the collapse of the USSR, Maslin secured the nuclear arsenal without letting a single weapon be lost.

References

1937 births
2022 deaths
Russian generals
Recipients of the Order of the Red Star
Soviet Army officers
People from Morshansky District